Vanished Kingdoms: The History of Half-Forgotten Europe (sometimes referred to with another subtitle as Vanished Kingdoms: Exploring Europe's Lost Realms) is a history book about fourteen former European countries, such as the Grand Duchy of Lithuania, Kingdom of Galicia and Lodomeria, Kingdom of Aragon and Prussia, written by the English historian Norman Davies. It was published by Allen Lane in 2011.

References

External links 

 Vanished Kingdoms on Norman Davies homepage

21st-century history books
Books by Norman Davies
English-language books
Books about Europe
2011 non-fiction books
Allen Lane (imprint) books